Christmas With You is the 15th studio album by Australian singer-songwriter Rick Springfield, his only holiday-themed album, and his second album consisting primarily of cover songs, the first being The Day After Yesterday from 2005.

Critical reception 

Stephen Thomas Erlewine of AllMusic gave the overtly religious holiday album mostly positive remarks, writing "Springfield not only sticks to the classics, he gives many of these spare, baroque acoustic treatments that emphasize their folk origin." Erlewine concludes his review with: "The album could use just a little bit more...fun, but in its measured, inventive way, Christmas with You is far from the standard holiday album, and it's hard not to admire that Springfield opted for something different on his Christmas record than ...the same songs that show up on most seasonal albums by veteran artists."

Track listing 

Total length: 45:22

References

External links 
 Rick Springfield Official Website
 Christmas with You at Allmusic.com

2007 albums
Rick Springfield albums